The Khanzada Rajputs are a Muslim Rajput community found in the northern part of the Indian subcontinent, particularly in Rajasthan, Haryana and Sindh.

Khanzada may also refer to:

 Khanzadas of Mewat, a ruling dynasty in Rajputana, India
Khanzada Khan (Pakistani politician), Pakistani politician for the Pakistan Peoples Party
 Khanzada Begum (1478–1545), Timurid princess and sister of the Mughal emperor Babur
 Sevin Beg Khanzada (1360–1411), Khwarezmian princess

See also
Khanzada Khan (disambiguation), a list of rulers Khanzada Rajput rulers of Mewat